In European and Assyrian usage, the name Toma is a version of Thomas, originating from Aramaic t’om’a, meaning twin. In the Russian language, Toma may be a diminutive of the male first name Avtonom.

It is also a female name, meaning "date palm tree", derived from Tamar, which is a Hebrew Bible name.

In Japan, it is a male name which is unrelated with the Bible nor "Thomas."  The meaning will vary by which kanji are used to write this name.   Another name, Tōma, may also be Latinized as "Toma."

People with this surname
The Toma family is originally from Muralto (Switzerland) who emigrated to Eastern Europe between the end of the 18th century and the beginning of the 19th century.

Adrian Toma (born 1976), Romanian football player
Alexandru Toma (1875–1954), Romanian poet, journalist and translator
András Toma (1925–2004), Hungarian soldier, the last prisoner of WW2 to be repatriated
Costică Toma (1928–2008), Romanian footballer
Dorin Toma (born 1977), Romanian footballer
Emile Toma (1919–1985), Palestinian political historian
George Toma (born 1929), American groundskeeper
HoSo Terra Toma, Korean drag queen
Miguel Ángel Toma, Argentine politician
Peter Toma, Hungarian-born computer scientist
Sanda Toma (rower) (born 1956), Romanian female rower
Sanda Toma (canoeist) (born 1970), Romanian female canoeist
Svetlana Toma (born 1947), Moldovan-Russian actress
Valer Toma (born 1957), Romanian rower
Veresa Toma (born 1981), Fijian footballer
Yumi Tōma (born 1966), Japanese voice actress

People with this given name
Toma bar Yacoub, 9th century Nestorian Assyrian bishop
Toma Bebić (1935–1990), Croatian musician and artist
Toma Caragiu (1925–1977), Romanian actor
Toma Ciorbă (1864–1936), Romanian physician
Toma Enache (born 1970), Romanian film director
Toma Ghițulescu (1902–1983), Romanian engineer, politician, and Olympic bobsledder
Toma Ikuta (born 1984), (properly Ikuta Tōma), Japanese actor and singer
Toma Macovei (1911–2003), Romanian soldier and linguist
Toma Ovici, Romanian tennis player
Toma Prošev (1931–1996), Macedonian composer
Toma Rosandić (1878–1959), Croatian sculptor
Toma Sik (Toma Ŝik) (1939–2004), Hungarian-Israeli peace activist
Toma Simionov (born 1955), Romanian canoer
Toma Toke (born 1985), Tongan rugby union player
Toma Tomov (born 1958), Bulgarian athlete
Toma Zdravkov (born 1987), Bulgarian singer, winner of Music Idol song contest
Toma Zdravković (1938–1991), Serbian folk singer

Fictional characters
Toma Kamijo, main protagonist of A Certain Magical Index

See also

Tola (name)
Tomești (disambiguation)
Tomulești (disambiguation)
Tona (name)
Tova

References

Notes

Sources
Н. А. Петровский (N. A. Petrovsky). "Словарь русских личных имён" (Dictionary of Russian First Names). ООО Издательство "АСТ". Москва, 2005. 

Aromanian masculine given names
Bosnian masculine given names
Bulgarian masculine given names
Croatian masculine given names
Romanian-language surnames
Romanian masculine given names
Serbian masculine given names